Deanna Monroe is a fictional character from AMC's television series, The Walking Dead, and was portrayed by Tovah Feldshuh. The character is an adaptation and gender-swap of Douglas Monroe from the comic book series, on which the show is based.

Overview
The character, a former congressperson from Ohio, acts as the leader of the Alexandria Safe-Zone located in Washington, DC. and assigns its inhabitants job roles based on their characteristics and backgrounds.

Feldshuh explained that her portrayal of Deanna was inspired by Hillary Clinton. She said: "I based her on Hillary Clinton. She's somebody I've admired and somebody incredibly qualified to lead the nation. She's been in service to the United States for a good deal of her life. I studied her as my immediate prototype. I looked at other wonderful congresswomen, and tried to think what I could bring to it: Where did the character connect with my character as a human being? Because there was no time. Don't forget, this wasn't my audition (character). It's not like subliminally I had prepared." On her auditioning process, she described it as "extremely tense" but also "wonderful". She considered Alexandria an "incredible naivete" citing that nothing has happened to the community since the outbreak. On bringing Rick Grimes and the survivors into the community, she said: "Deanna is clearly looking to connect with street smarts, brawn, muscle, but not hooliganism. She has to make sure these people are rational." She further commented that Deanna is a culturist who "needs [Rick's] brawn [just as much as] he needs her cultural brain."

Feldshuh explained Deanna and the community saying: "Alexandria is named after the greatest city with the greatest library in the world—it was the first great library in Alexander’s empire. And Deanna is a woman of the book. She’s a woman of high intellect and a woman who is highly cultured. She’s a woman who knows how to get a grandma to babysit little children in her 30-member society. But as a great leader, she knows they need new blood. They need new blood to procreate. They need new genetic pools to get some strong blood in there. And she’s desperate for brawn, for warriors that they can trust."

Character biography
Before the outbreak Deanna was an Ohio congresswoman. She has a husband named Reg who is a professor of architecture, and they have two sons named Aiden and Spencer. When the outbreak occurred, Deanna and her family were returning to Ohio when the military re-directed them back shortly to a safe-zone community before the military itself was overrun. However, Reg used the supplies from a shopping mall still under construction to build a large set of walls around the safe-zone, but it was at the cost of 14 people's lives. Deanna was established as the community's leader, though she herself had very minimal experience in the outside world. Her inexperience is exactly why Deanna believed they needed to recruit people who had experienced the harshness of the outside world in order to help them better prepare for it. However, Deanna exiled three people from the community who "didn't work out" which left a heavy burden on her conscience. Aaron, one the Alexandria's recruiters, later reveals one of these men to be named Davidson.

Season 5 

In the episode "Remember", Deanna is introduced as the leader of Alexandria who interviews every member of Rick Grimes's group to get to know them and to help her find roles for them to contribute to the community. She takes a particular liking to Rick and correctly guesses that he was in a position of authority before the outbreak, a sheriff. But she also learns that he killed so many people that doesn't even remember how many, people who used any brutal methods to survive which resulted in the deaths of other members of his group. However, Deanna believes Rick and his crew are the very people they need to defend the community and confesses to Rick about exiling three people who couldn't adapt and Rick becomes more trusting of her. She also interviews Daryl Dixon who paces with his crossbow and a dead possum and refuses to sit down which leaves Deanna puzzled.  When she interviews Carol Peletier, Carol lies about her past, implying that she has few survival skills, and Deanna gives her the job of elderly assistance. During her interview, Michonne expresses her desire and gratitude to have found the community, something she has wanted for a long time. Deanna also interviews Glenn Rhee who admits they were almost outside too long and need this to work, and Deanna assigns him to runs with Aiden. She also interviews Rick's son Carl, with baby sister Judith, who confesses that he killed his mother to stop her turning but remarks that she would be happy they found this place. Deanna gives two houses to Rick's group to divide among themselves. Deanna later checks up on the group who have all decided to stay in the one house, which she understands as simple precautions and expresses amazement to how close, despite their differences, they have become. Deanna states that guns aren't allowed within the community only when they're outside, but does allow them to keep their blade weapons. Later she arrives to see Glenn and Aiden come to blows over the nature of a run gone wrong, which results in them, Daryl and Nicholas getting into a heated fight.  She then addresses the community, instructing them to accept Rick and his group, and then separately thanks Glenn for knocking some sense into Aiden. She offers Rick and Michonne the positions of town constables which they accept.

In the episode "Forget", Rick speaks to Deanna about defending the walls with patrols and arming a few selected people to take watch, which Deanna deems unnecessary. When asked about the shifts people take in the clock tower, Deanna replies with the revelation that the town has no official lookout-- which both surprises and angers Rick. Sasha vehemently volunteers to be the first lookout on the tower and asks to have as many shifts as possible. Deanna notices this and refuses to let Sasha have a job like this so early. Deanna tells them that she will host a party for all residents for Alexandria to celebrate the induction of Rick's group (especially Judith) into their community, and tells Rick that she will authorize the use of a lookout in the tower if his group attends. He accepts, and Deanna leaves to make preparations for their party. She is later seen introducing her husband, Reg Monroe, to Rick and Michonne. Being the leader of the community, much of her time is monopolized by requests from residents, and she is therefore unable to socialize with Rick and his group. The following day, Deanna personally oversees the departure of Sasha for a quick walk. Sasha tells Deanna that the lifestyle of Alexandria is not real, but Deanna proudly dismisses Sasha's perspective, calling it "bullshit" before handing her a box of ammo, officially assigning her to her new job as the sharpshooter on the clock tower. In the episode "Spend", Deanna and Reg see their son Aiden off as he and a small group go on a run. Later Tobin comes to the house to make her elect Abraham Ford as head of the construction crew. After he has gone, she is concerned about electing another of Rick's people into a position of power but Maggie Greene, who is her assistant now, reassures her it will be okay. Father Gabriel Stokes then comes to the house to warn her that Rick's group are bad people.

In the episode "Try", Deanna, Reg, and Spencer are mourning the loss of Aiden. They play one of Aiden's mix tapes in remembrance of him. Carol leaves the family a casserole, but Deanna does not take it and only burns the note that was included. Rick goes over to her where she is standing by her son's grave and tells her that he is sorry for her loss. He brings up that Jessie is being domestically abused by her husband Pete. Deanna reveals that she knew about this and "hoped that it would get better". Rick wants to know why nothing has been done to stop Pete. Deanna informs him that this is because Pete is a doctor, and therefore valuable, and she doesn't see a solution to the situation. Rick says that he will take care of the problem himself by killing him. Deanna strictly forbids him from ever doing anything such as killing another person. Rick tells her that Pete could end up killing Jessie, but Deanna tells him that if this were to happen, she would exile him, not execute him. Later, she is called over after Pete and Rick brutally fight. She tries to break up the situation until Rick points a gun at her and the other safe-zone residents. She stands listening to Rick's speech until Michonne knocks him out.

In the season finale "Conquer", Deanna first appears in the episode when she is talking with Maggie about what happened between Rick and Pete. She later says that a meeting will be held in the community that evening. Maggie tries to convince her that Rick did not mean any harm by what he did, but Deanna just tells Maggie that everything will be settled in the meeting later that night. At the meeting, Deanna notices that Rick is not present. Deanna reveals what Gabriel told her about Rick's group. Deanna and the others then are shocked when Rick arrives at the meeting and throws a dead walker in front of them and tells Deanna that walkers got in because the gate was left open. Spencer notes that he asked Gabriel to secure the gate, and Deanna sends Spencer off to find Gabriel as Rick addresses the crowd telling them that the living and the dead will never stop trying to take what they have, and they will always need to be ready for it. Pete then appears with Michonne's katana intending to kill Rick. Reg tries to calm Pete down, only for Pete to cut his throat, killing him. Grief-stricken and enraged, she says "Rick? Do it". Rick, without hesitation, shoots Pete in the head.

Season 6 

In the season premiere, Deanna agrees with Rick not to bury Pete inside Alexandria, and gives the order to take him away, as a result of which they are able to discover a quarry full of walkers in the vicinity of the community. During the village meeting to decide what to do with the horde, Deanna remains alienated from the discussion; when it is finally her time to give an opinion, she supports Rick's proposal without hesitation and gives the order for others to do the same.

While Rick and the others carry out the plan to ward off the walkers, Deanna stays in Alexandria in the company of Maggie, who encourages her to overcome her depression and be the leader the Alexandrines need, adding that it is what Reg would have wanted. Deanna is briefly inspired, but when the town is suddenly attacked by the Wolves, she again feels hopeless. Instead of helping to defend her home, Deanna remains hidden, considering herself a burden, and once the battle ends she observes with sadness the terrible losses they had suffered. Maggie, however, continues to support her and advises her to be strong for those who have survived. Unfortunately, the attack of The Wolves ends up attracting a large part of the horde of walkers to the surroundings of the community, endangering the entire community. When Spencer talks a crowd out of raiding the pantries, she is proud of him until she discovers that it was all a deception on his part. She berates him, and he in turn blames her for the deaths of Reg and Aiden, and accuses her of giving the community false hope. Being taken by surprise by a walker - one of the Wolves who was killed in the previous attack - she takes out her anger on the creature, until Rick finally kills it. 

In the mid-season finale, when the horde of walkers enter Alexandria, Deanna and the others lock themselves inside Jessie's house, but not before a walker seriously injures her. Michonne tries to help her, but discovers that she had been bitten by one of the walkers. In her last moments, Deanna gives Michonne hope about the future of Alexandria and makes Rick promise to take care of her son. After they leave, Deanna is attacked and killed by walkers.

Eventually Deanna is revived as a walker and wanders for several weeks around Alexandria. After Carl and Enid find her, they lead her to Alexandria, where Spencer puts her out of her misery by cutting off her head. He and Michonne then bury her, and mark her grave with a "D".

Casting 
Feldshuh explained: "They got in touch with me and I did go in and read in a scene, but it was for the head of intelligence from an entirely different script. The script was so camouflaged I had no idea. It had nothing whatsoever to do with the part I was then given. But the scene they gave me was fantastic and it must have had the traits they were looking for in the character they then offered me, which was Deanna Monroe."

Feldshuh was promoted to series regular in the sixth season.

Reception 
Zack Handlen praised the character saying: "I was surprised at how much I liked Deanna. She just seems so reasonable! Also, she’s a former congressperson who is so good at reading people that, if she hadn’t won re-election, she was going to be a poker player. That’s a fun backstory."

Noel Murray of Rolling Stone ranked Deanna Monroe 23rd in a list of 30 best Walking Dead characters, saying, "Trusting Rick led to a breach in the ASZ's walls, and then her own untimely end – which, on the plus side, meant she didn't live to see the disruptive threat of the Saviors. Before she was eaten, the congresswoman passed her values on to Maggie, inspiring her to become a leader."

References 

Horror television characters
Television characters introduced in 2015
Fictional characters from Ohio
Fictional politicians
The Walking Dead (franchise) characters
Fictional zombies and revenants